Igor Pamić (born 19 November 1969) is a Croatian former professional footballer and current manager.

He made five appearances for the Croatia national team during his playing career.

Playing career

Club
He was born in the village of Žminj in Istria and started his professional career at the club Istra Pula in early 1992. He left the club after two seasons for Dinamo Zagreb, where he spent another two seasons before moving to Osijek in July 1995. After one season with Osijek, he moved abroad by signing with French club Sochaux in July 1996. He scored a total of 57 goals in five seasons of playing in the Croatian First League.

At club level, he left Sochaux in June 1997 after one season of playing for the club and went on to sign with German Bundesliga side Hansa Rostock. In a season and half of playing for Hansa, Pamić appeared in a total of 37 Bundesliga matches and managed to score 13 goals for the club in the league. With the beginning of the year 1999, he transferred to Austrian Bundesliga side Grazer AK and continued to play for the club before he finished his career as a player in the autumn of 2001, playing his last league match on 21 October 2001 against Rapid Wien. In two half-seasons and two entire seasons of playing for GAK, he appeared in a total of 66 Bundesliga matches and scored 23 goals.

International
He made his debut for the Croatian national team in a friendly match against Hungary on 10 April 1996 in Osijek and also managed to score his first and only international goal in this match. He was subsequently also part of the Croatian squad at the UEFA Euro 1996 finals in England, but made only one appearance at the tournament by playing the first half of the final group match against Portugal. He subsequently appeared in only two more matches for the Croatian national team, playing as a substitute in a 1996 friendly against Morocco as well as in the Croatian team's first UEFA Euro 2000 qualifier against the Republic of Ireland on 5 September 1998. In all, he won a total of five international caps and scored one goal for Croatia.

Managerial career
Shortly after retiring from football as a player, Pamić started his managerial career in the sport. He was the head coach of Croatian Third League side NK Žminj in 2002 and 2003, going on to move to Croatian Second League side NK Pula in early 2004, helping them to clinch promotion to the Croatian First League for the 2004–05 season.

Pamić left Pula in the winter break of the 2005–06 season and returned to Žminj in 2006, spending a season with the club. In 2007, he was appointed head coach at Karlovac, with whom he clinched promotion to the Croatian First League in 2009. He returned to Karlovac 1919 in October 2021, after spells at the helm of Slovenian club Koper, Montenegrin outfit OFK Titograd and Bosnian side GOŠK Gabela

Personal life
His sons Zvonko and Alen are also a professional football players. His son Alen died in June 2013.

Career statistics

Club

International

Managerial statistics

Honours

Player
Croatia Zagreb
Croatian Cup: 1994

Grazer AK
Austrian Cup: 2000, 2002
Austrian Super Cup: 2000

Manager
Žminj
Treća HNL - West: 2002–03

Karlovac
Treća HNL - West: 2007–08
Druga HNL: 2008–09

References

External links
 

1969 births
Living people
People from Istria County
Association football forwards
Croatian footballers
Croatia international footballers
UEFA Euro 1996 players
NK Istra players
NK Pazinka players
GNK Dinamo Zagreb players
NK Osijek players
FC Sochaux-Montbéliard players
FC Hansa Rostock players
Grazer AK players
Croatian Football League players
Ligue 2 players
Bundesliga players
Austrian Football Bundesliga players
Croatian expatriate footballers
Expatriate footballers in France
Croatian expatriate sportspeople in France
Expatriate footballers in Germany
Croatian expatriate sportspeople in Germany
Expatriate footballers in Austria
Croatian expatriate sportspeople in Austria
Croatian football managers
NK Istra 1961 managers
NK Karlovac managers
FC Koper managers
NK Hrvatski Dragovoljac managers
OFK Titograd managers
NK GOŠK Gabela managers
Croatian expatriate football managers
Expatriate football managers in Slovenia
Croatian expatriate sportspeople in Slovenia
Expatriate football managers in Bosnia and Herzegovina
Croatian expatriate sportspeople in Bosnia and Herzegovina
Expatriate football managers in Montenegro
Croatian expatriate sportspeople in Montenegro